Dugdale is an unincorporated community in Polk County, Minnesota, United States.

The community is located east of Crookston and south of Red Lake Falls on Minnesota State Highway 32.

A post office called Dugdale was established in 1884, and remained in operation until 1927. Dugdale had a depot on the railroad.

References

Unincorporated communities in Minnesota
Unincorporated communities in Polk County, Minnesota